The Berrima Correctional Centre is an Australian prison, located at Berrima, New South Wales. The Centre was operational between 1839 and 2011 with a number of breaks in between, and was re-opened in September 2016. Initially established as Berrima Gaol, the facility closed in 1909 and reopened in 1949 as the Berrima Training Centre. The Centre is the oldest Australian correctional facility in operation. It was added to the New South Wales State Heritage Register on 2 April 1999.

History

The old Berrima Gaol was built in 1835-9 of local sandstone at a cost of £5,400. Convicted London joiner and carpenter James Gough (1790-1876) who arrived on the Earl Spencer in 1813 and gained his conditional pardon in 1821, was awarded the construction of Berrima Gaol in partnership with John Richards in 1834; much of the construction work was done by convicts in irons. It initially comprised 34 cells accommodating 66 prisoners. The design was adopted by the Governor, Richard Bourke, from the SIPD (Society for the Improvement of Prison Discipline) pamphlet. Conditions at the gaol were harsh, prisoners spent most of their days in cells and the only light was through a small grate set in the door. It was originally designed to hold prisoners from the surrounding areas, but Goulburn Gaol took over this role and it became a subsidiary prison housing sick and aged convicts from other gaols.

Australia's first serial killer John Lynch was hanged here in 1842. Another of the notable trials held in the nearby Berrima Court House was that of Lucretia Dunkley and her lover Martin Beech. Both were hanged in 1843 for the murder of Dunkley's husband. Dunkley was the only woman hanged at Berrima Gaol.

In 1866 the Gaol was renovated to the standards described by the prison reform movement for a "model prison", enlarging the prison such as to provide separate cells for 110 prisoners. However, Berrima Gaol had solitary confinement cells which measured 8 feet by 5 feet, some smaller, where it was intended that all prisoners spent one year. In 1877 a Royal Commission was held to investigate allegations of cruelty by the prison authorities, but the complaints were not upheld.

In 1898, a residence for the governor (or superintendent) of the jail was built next door to the gaol. In the 1930s it was used as a police station. A house for the deputy superintendent was built on the other side of the gaol.

The gaol was closed in 1909. During World War I the army used Berrima Gaol (in conjunction with an adjacent area, now known as the Berrima Internment Camp Huts Area) as a German-prisoner internment camp. Most of the 329 internees were enemy aliens from shipping companies. There were German officers from Rabaul, German New Guinea (what is now Papua New Guinea) and also officers from the light cruiser SMS Emden.

Between the wars the gaol was opened for public inspection as a place of historic interest. From 1944 to 1949, the whole gaol was rebuilt by prison labour at a cost of 18,000 pounds. Only the entrance and outer walls of old Berrima Gaol were left standing. In 1948 the Berrima Training Centre, a minimum security correctional centre opened at the Berrima Gaol.

Between 1970 and 2001, the Centre was classified as minimum/medium security for male inmates. Most inmates were permitted to work outside of the Centre on the local market gardens managed by Corrective Services NSW. Some detainees were permitted to maintain local parks and gardens and also assist with duties in the community such as fighting fires with the local firefighters.

In 2001 the Centre changed its name to Berrima Correctional Centre and, after one hundred and sixty six years as a men's prison, the Centre became a woman's prison, with a capacity of fifty-nine inmates.

Immediately prior to its closure in 2011, the Centre was an all-female low-to-medium-security prison, and was responsible for the administration of a periodic detention centre and court cells at Wollongong. In the 2011 NSW State Budget, the Government announced that the centre would be closed, which took effect on 4 November 2011.

The Centre was re-opened on 27 September 2016 as part of a statewide initiative to add 1400 beds to the New South Wales prison population. It is expected to house 75 minimum security prisoners.

Heritage listing 
Berrima Gaol is one of the few remaining compounds dating from pre 1840. It is an early example of the application of model prison layouts. Associated with the development of Berrima, and the adjacent courthouse, the Gaol is significant for its phases of use.

Berrima Correctional Centre was listed on the New South Wales State Heritage Register on 2 April 1999.

Photo gallery

See also

Punishment in Australia

References

Citations

Sources 

 
 
 

 Attribution

External links 
 

1839 establishments in Australia
Prisons in New South Wales
Military history of Australia during World War I
Military camps in Australia
2011 disestablishments in Australia
New South Wales State Heritage Register
New South Wales places listed on the defunct Register of the National Estate
Berrima, New South Wales
Articles incorporating text from the New South Wales State Heritage Register
Mortimer Lewis buildings